Nationality words link to articles with information on the nation's poetry or literature (for instance, Irish or France).

Events

Works published

Births
Death years link to the corresponding "[year] in poetry" article. There are conflicting or unreliable sources for the birth years of many people born in this period; where sources conflict, the poet is listed again and the conflict is noted:

973:
 Dec. 26: Al-Ma'arri (died 1057), blind Arab philosopher, poet and writer
 Murasaki Shikibu (died 1014 or (died 1025)), Japanese woman poet

Deaths
Birth years link to the corresponding "[year] in poetry" article:

970:
 Minamoto no Saneakira (born 910), one of the Thirty-six Poetry Immortals of Japan

973:
 Hrotsvitha (born 935), Latin language poet and dramatist from Saxony

975:
 Adikavi Pampa (born 902), writing in Kannada language

978:
 Li Houzhu (born 936), Southern Tang and Song poet

See also

 Poetry
 10th century in poetry
 10th century in literature
 List of years in poetry

Other events:
 Other events of the 12th century
 Other events of the 13th century

10th century:
 10th century in poetry
 10th century in literature

Notes

10th-century poetry
Poetry